David Byron Cole (June 3, 1962 – January 24, 1995) was an American songwriter and record producer. Cole was one half of the dance-music duo C+C Music Factory, which he founded with his musical partner Robert Clivillés.

Robert Clivillés and David Cole also produced various hits for other artists such as Mariah Carey, Aretha Franklin, James Brown, Lisa Lisa and Cult Jam, Deborah Cooper, and many others. 
After Cole's death in 1995, Robert Clivillés continued to keep C+C Music Factory going through his own production work.

Musical career
Tennessee native Cole was a keyboardist at a church choir in 1984 when, already a regular guest there, in club Better Days he approached club owner Bruce Forest. Forest was known for playing live keyboards and drum machines on top of existing records. Forest invited Cole to join him in the record booth to play live keyboards over record. Cole continued to do so even after he had gained world wide success in the early 1990s. Robert Clivillés was resident DJ in Better Days and the two became firm friends. In the late 1980s, Clivillés and Cole were active in the groups 2 Puerto Ricans, a Blackman, and a Dominican and The 28th Street Crew. At the time they were the driving force of the short-lived Brat Pack. Cole also released one solo single called "You Take My Breath Away" in 1988. The duo were also responsible for the formation of pop group Seduction, for whom they wrote and produced a string of Top-10 hits. They contributed to the career of former The Weather Girls vocalist Martha Wash, who at the same time was one of the lead vocalists for the dance act Black Box. In 1990, Clivillés and Cole released a single featuring later C+C Music Factory rapper Freedom Williams, called "Get Dumb! (Free Your Body)", as The Crew. The duo's biggest success, however, was the group C+C Music Factory, which became a worldwide sensation in 1991.

Copyright lawsuits
In 1989, Clivillés and Cole wrote a song titled "Get Dumb (Free Your Body)" that was originally performed under the name The Crew, featuring Freedom Williams, and later by Seduction. They allegedly illegally sampled portions of "The Music Got Me", which was written by Boyd Jarvis of early-1980s music group Visual. Boyd sued them for copyright infringement in 1990, and demanded $15 million in royalties.

Four years later, Kevin McCord filed a copyright infringement lawsuit against Mariah Carey, Cole, Clivillés, and Columbia Records, because, according to McCord, they took parts of his song called "I Want to Thank You" and created "Make It Happen" out of it without permission.  Although the allegations were proven false, McCord eventually accepted a settlement offer of about US$500,000.

Death
Cole died on January 24, 1995, after a long illness. The official cause was announced by Robert Clivillés as complications from spinal meningitis. It has been speculated by others in the music community that he died of complications from AIDS, but no proof exists.
Cole was buried at East Ridgelawn Cemetery in Clifton, New Jersey.

The song "One Sweet Day" by Mariah Carey, featuring Boyz II Men, was written by Carey in memory of Cole.

Discography

Solo
 "You Take My Breath Away" (single) (1988)

with 2 Puerto Ricans, a Blackman, and a Dominican
 "Do It Properly" (single) (1987)
 "Scandalous" (single) (1989)

with The 28th Street Crew
 I Need a Rhythm (1989)
 "O" (1994)

with The Crew
 "Get Dumb! (Free Your Body) (feat. Freedom Williams)" (single) (1990)

with C+C Music Factory

Other releases
 Greatest Remixes Vol. 1 (as Clivillés + Cole) (1992)

References

External links
 MTV announcement of David Cole's passing (video)
 

1962 births
1995 deaths
Record producers from Tennessee
Club DJs
Music of East Tennessee
Remixers
Grammy Award winners
People from Johnson City, Tennessee
Neurological disease deaths in New York (state)
Infectious disease deaths in New York (state)
Deaths from meningitis
20th-century American businesspeople
C+C Music Factory members